Melanie Beddie is an Australian actor, director, dramaturg and acting teacher. She is founder and director of Branch Theatre Company.

Early life and education
Beddie completed a BA in English and Philosophy at Sydney University from 1981 to 1984. It was here, through an association with Sydney University Dramatic Society (SUDS) and she acted in and directed numerous productions with the society. She was President of SUDS in 1984.

She moved from Sydney to Melbourne to train as an actor at the Victorian College of Arts (VCA) School of Drama from 1985 to 1987.

She later completed a PhD on actor training at La Trobe University.

Career
Beddie started her career with Arena Theatre Company, and continued to work nationally as an actor across a wide range of professional companies such as Melbourne Theatre Company (MTC), Playbox, Going Through Stages, HotHouse Theatre, and Playworks and at the Australian National Playwrights Conferences.

Beddie co-founded, with a group of other artists, an independent theatre company, the $5 Theatre Company, as funding became scarcer in the 1990s. They had a strong political motive in making theatre affordable, and played to full houses, showing that people did want to attend theatre. Appointed as a dramaturg, she helped develop the concept and practice of dramaturgy, which she says is "mostly about asking questions" – finding out what the kernel of the production is and helping to hone it towards that. She worked with Andrew Bovell and others at $5 Theatre.

In 1994 she appeared in Remember Ronald Ryan, and in 2000 directed Violet Inc. at the Malthouse Theatre.

Beddie founded the Branch Theatre Company in 1998, still operational in 2018, which she uses for her own experimentation now and then.)

She was resident dramaturg at the MTC from 1998 to 1999. She has directed productions at MTC, Playbox, HotHouse, La Mama, Playworks, and Hit Productions, as well as in smaller companies and in drama schools. In the 2000s, she learnt to extend the boundaries of dramaturgy. She has also taught at VCA.

She co-founded Australian Women Directors Alliance (AWDA) in the 2000s, which advocated for more roles for women in theatre, particularly through the Melbourne Theatre Company, achieving a lot through "public shaming" of theatre boards. AWDA is still in existence .

In February 2018 she directed Crazy Brave by Michael Gurr at La Mama.

She has also appeared in a few short films and several television series, including Neighbours, Blue Heelers and Halifax f.p..

She has published several papers on actor training and related topics, is  teaches at the drama school at Federation University Australia (since at least 2018).

Recognition and awards
 Recipient of the inaugural Dramaturgy Fellowship from the Australia Council
 Gloria Award from NIDA
 Director's Choice Award for Infectious, a cross-art form cabaret
 Green Room Award for Best Director for Traitors by Stephen Sewell 
 2001: Director of an award-winning production of Raindancers at MTC
 2009: Co-director, with Rachael Maza, Sisters of Gelam, nominated for a Deadly Award

References

External links

Branch Theatre Co. on Facebook

Australian stage actresses
Australian theatre directors
Living people
Year of birth missing (living people)